Manase Jesse Sapolu (born March 10, 1961) is a Samoan former American football player in the National Football League (NFL). He played both center and offensive guard, and played his entire career for the San Francisco 49ers.

Sapolu attended Farrington High School and the University of Hawaii in Honolulu.  Standing 6 feet 4 inches, 278 lbs., he was selected by the Oakland Invaders in the 17th round (199th pick overall) of the 1983 USFL Draft, and selected by San Francisco 49ers in the 11th round (289th pick overall) of the 1983 NFL Draft.  He signed with the San Francisco 49ers on July 10, 1983.

Sapolu is one of six 49ers to own four Super Bowl championship rings (1984, 1988, 1989, and 1994), and the only one of those to earn a ring with the '94 team rather than their first title in 1981.  He earned Pro Bowl honors in 1993 and 1994.

Since retiring in 1997, Sapolu and his wife Lisa have lived in [Southern, CA], and remains active in the community as well with the San Francisco 49ers alumni.

Sapolu has been an integral part in establishing the Polynesian Pro Football Hall of Fame, of which he is a co-founder. He now runs Men In The Trenches (MITT) in California.

References

Further reading

External links
 Hawaii Sports Hall of Fame profile
 

1961 births
Living people
American football centers
American football offensive guards
Hawaii Rainbow Warriors football players
San Francisco 49ers players
High school football coaches in California
National Conference Pro Bowl players
Sportspeople from Honolulu
Players of American football from Honolulu
Sportspeople from Apia
Samoan players of American football
Samoan emigrants to the United States
American sportspeople of Samoan descent
Ed Block Courage Award recipients